Anthem is a solo album by American guitarist Ralph Towner recorded in 2000 and released on the ECM label.

Reception 
The Allmusic review by Thom Jurek awarded the album 4½ stars, stating, "Anthem is Towner's finest album in a decade and one of the finest in his distinguished career".

Track listing 
All compositions by Ralph Towner except as indicated
 "Solitary Woman" - 6:57 
 "Anthem" - 4:54 
 "Haunted" - 3:08 
 "The Lutemaker" - 4:21 
 "Simone" - 6:03 
 "Gloria's Step" (Scott LaFaro) - 2:51 
 "Four Comets Part 1" - 1:06 
 "Four Comets Part 2" - 1:12 
 "Four Comets Part 3" - 1:02 
 "Four Comets Part 4" - 0:52 
 "Raffish" - 4:14 
 "Very Late" - 4:02 
 "The Prowler" - 5:01 
 "Three Comments Part 1" - 1:32 
 "Three Comments Part 2" - 0:31 
 "Three Comments Part 3" - 0:54 
 "Goodbye Pork Pie Hat" (Charles Mingus) - 1:54 
Recorded at Rainbow Studio in Oslo, Norway in February 2000.

Personnel 
 Ralph Towner — classical guitar, 12 string guitar

References 

2001 albums
Albums produced by Manfred Eicher
ECM Records albums
Ralph Towner albums
Instrumental albums